Jordan House or Jordan Farm may refer to:

Henry-Jordan House, Guntersville, Alabama, listed on the NRHP in Marshall County, Alabama
Jordan Ranch, Sedona, Arizona, listed on the NRHP in Coconino County, Arizona
Jordan House (Laguna Beach, California), designed by architect John Lautner
Orin Jordan House, Whittier, California, NRHP-listed
Rufus P. Jordan House, Longboat Key, Florida, NRHP-listed
Jordan-Beggs House, Madison, Florida, NRHP-listed
Jordan-Bellew House, Monticello, Georgia, listed on the NRHP in Jasper County, Georgia
Campbell-Jordan House, Washington, Georgia, listed on the NRHP in Wilkes County, Georgia
Jordan House (West Des Moines, Iowa), listed on the NRHP in Polk County, Iowa
Charles A. Jordan House, Auburn, Maine, NRHP-listed
Dr. Charles Jordan House, Wakefield, Maine, NRHP-listed
Jordan House (Carthage, Mississippi), listed on the NRHP in Leake County, Mississippi
Charles R. Jordan House, West Point, Mississippi, listed on the NRHP in Clay County, Mississippi
Moses Jordan House, West Point, Mississippi, listed on the NRHP in Clay County, Mississippi
Dr. Abram Jordan House, Claverack, New York, NRHP-listed
Dr. Arch Jordan House, Caldwell, North Carolina, listed on the NRHP in Orange County, North Carolina
Marion Jasper Jordan Farm, Gulf, North Carolina, listed on the NRHP in Chatham County, North Carolina
Bowen-Jordan Farm, Siler City, North Carolina, listed on the NRHP in Chatham County, North Carolina
Jordan House (Windsor, North Carolina), listed on the NRHP in Bertie County, North Carolina
William B. Jordan Farm, Eagleville, Tennessee, listed on the NRHP in Rutherford County, Tennessee
Jordan-Williams House, Nolensville, Tennessee, listed on the NRHP in Williamson County, Tennessee
Newton Jordan House, Triune, Tennessee, listed on the NRHP in Williamson County, Tennessee
Jordan-Koch House, Victoria, Texas, listed on the NRHP in Victoria County, Texas
Joseph Jordan House, Raynor, Virginia, listed on the NRHP in Isle of Wight County, Virginia

See also 
 Jordan House Hotel Ltd v Menow, a landmark Supreme Court of Canada case on liability of establishments serving alcohol